The 1987–88 Algerian Cup was the 26th edition of the Algerian Cup. USM Alger won the Cup by defeating CR Belcourt 5-4 on penalties in the final, after the game ended 0-0. It was USM Alger second Algerian Cup in its history.

Round of 64

Round of 32

Round of 16

Quarter-finals

Semi-finals

Final

Champions

External links
 1987/88 Coupe Nationale

Algerian Cup
Algerian Cup
Algerian Cup